Indonesia competed at the 2022 ASEAN Para Games in Surakarta, Indonesia. Originally scheduled to take place in 2021, The games were planned amidst the COVID-19 pandemic in Vietnam, posing logistical challenges in organizing the event.

Originally scheduled to be held from 17 to 23 December 2021, games were cancelled in October 2021 after the 2021 Southeast Asian Games was postponed to May 2022 due to the pandemic.

Medal summary

Medal by sport

Medal by date

Medalists

Archery 

In the 2022 ASEAN Para Games, the Indonesian archery team will field 12 athletes.

Athletics

Badminton 

Men

Women

Mixed

Blind Judo

Cerebal Palsy Football

Chess

Goalball

Sitting volleyball

Indonesia will be participating in the men's and women's tournament, sending a total of 16 players in Sitting volleyball.

Men's tournament

Group play

Women's tournament

Group play

Powerlifting

Swimming

Table tennis

Wheelchair basketball

Men's tournament

Group play

Bronze medal match

Wheelchair tennis

References

ASEAN Para Games
2022 ASEAN Para Games
Indonesia 2022
ASEAN Para Games, 2022